Panamint's Bad Man is a 1938 American Western film directed by Ray Taylor and written by Luci Ward and Charles Arthur Powell. The film stars Smith Ballew, Evelyn Daw, Noah Beery, Sr., Stanley Fields, Harry Woods and Pat J. O'Brien. The film was released on July 8, 1938, by 20th Century Fox.

Plot
Larry Kimball disguises himself as an outlaw after receiving an assignment to go to Panamint and capture a gang of outlaws lead by King Gorman.

Cast   
Smith Ballew as Larry Kimball
Evelyn Daw as Joan DeLysa
Noah Beery, Sr. as King Gorman 
Stanley Fields as Harold 'Black Jack' Deavers
Harry Woods as Craven
Pat J. O'Brien as Adams
Armand 'Curly' Wright as Enrico Nicola

References

External links 
 

1938 films
American Western (genre) films
American black-and-white films
1938 Western (genre) films
Films directed by Ray Taylor
20th Century Fox films
Panamint Range
Films produced by Sol Lesser
1930s English-language films
1930s American films